The Wells Fargo Center is a multi-purpose indoor arena located in Philadelphia. It serves as the home of the Philadelphia Flyers of the National Hockey League (NHL), the Philadelphia 76ers of the National Basketball Association (NBA), and the Philadelphia Wings of the National Lacrosse League (NLL). The arena lies at the southwest corner of the South Philadelphia Sports Complex, which includes Lincoln Financial Field, Citizens Bank Park, and Xfinity Live!.

The Wells Fargo Center, originally called Spectrum II, was completed in 1996 to replace the Spectrum as the home arena of the 76ers and Flyers, on the former site of John F. Kennedy Stadium at a cost of $210 million, largely privately financed (though the city and state helped to pay for the local infrastructure).  It is owned by Comcast Spectacor, which also owns the Flyers, and is operated by its arena-management subsidiary, Global Spectrum. Since opening, it has been known by a number of different names through naming rights deals and bank mergers, including CoreStates Center from 1996 to 1998, First Union Center from 1998 to 2003, and Wachovia Center from 2003 to 2010. Since 2010, naming rights have been held by financial services company Wells Fargo, after their acquisition of Wachovia. CoreStates Financial Corporation was acquired by First Union, which later also purchased Wachovia National Bank to rename itself Wachovia Corporation; the combined company was acquired by Wells Fargo in 2008.

In addition to hosting home games for its main tenants, the arena has been the site of a number of other notable athletic events including Games 1 and 2 from the 1997 and Games 3, 4 and 6 of the 2010 Stanley Cup Finals, Games 3, 4 and 5 of the 2001 NBA Finals, and various collegiate events for the National Collegiate Athletic Association (NCAA). Wells Fargo Center has hosted two political conventions, hosting the 2000 Republican National Convention and 2016 Democratic National Convention. The arena is a regular venue for concerts and WWE events. The arena has a concert seating capacity of 21,000 seated and at least 21,500 standing.

Naming rights

Prior to its construction, the proposed arena was tentatively called "Spectrum II". The Wells Fargo Center was originally named for CoreStates Financial Corporation, which agreed to pay $40 million over 21 years for the naming rights, with additional terms to be settled later for an additional eight-year period at the end of the contract.

The contract went  through multiple hands due to various bank mergers; first by First Union in 1998, Wachovia in 2003, and currently by Wells Fargo since July 2010. Installation of the new Wells Fargo Center branding began on July 27, 2010, with the removal of the Wachovia Center signage, followed by the installation of the new Wells Fargo Center signage.  Work was completed in September 2010.

During in the 2015–16 NBA season for a short time, the 76ers ceased recognizing Wells Fargo's naming rights and referred to the facility exclusively as "The Center", as the institution was not a sponsor of the team. The Wells Fargo Center logo decal which sat on the 76ers court was in the most minimal text discernible by television cameras, colored in white to blend in with the floor. (Reportedly, 76ers CEO Scott O'Neil's first idea was to color it with clear-coat paint only visible with UV blacklighting showing the logo during the opening of Sixers games when the arena lights were drawn down; however, the team, after discussion with their lawyers, elected not to do so.) With the start of the new year in January 2016 with input from Comcast Spectacor, the logo decal was enlarged and repainted in black. The 76ers then signed a non-signage sponsorship agreement with Firstrust Bank as their official banking sponsor.

Facilities

The Wells Fargo Center officially seats 20,318 for NBA and NCAA basketball and 19,541 for NHL hockey and indoor NLL lacrosse.  With additional standing-room admissions available in luxury and club-box suites, the total paid capacity increases. The Wells Fargo Center has 126 luxury suites, 1,880 club-box seats, and a variety of restaurants and clubs (both public and private) available for use by patrons. In addition, the offices, studios, and production facilities of NBC Sports Philadelphia are all located in the facility.

On June 10, 2005, the Wachovia Center set a record for the highest attendance for an indoor hockey game in the commonwealth of Pennsylvania (20,103) when the Philadelphia Phantoms won Game 4 of the 2005 Calder Cup Finals over the Chicago Wolves to win the Calder Cup. The attendance record was broken on June 9, 2010, as the Wachovia Center set another attendance record of 20,327 for Game 6 of the 2010 Stanley Cup Finals; the Flyers lost to the Chicago Blackhawks in overtime, which gave Chicago its first Stanley Cup since . The Wells Fargo Center also set a record for the highest attendances for a college basketball game in the commonwealth of Pennsylvania on January 29, 2017, when Villanova played and defeated Virginia before a crowd of 20,907.

On August 1, 2006, Comcast Spectacor announced it would install a new center-hung scoreboard to replace the original one made by Daktronics. The new scoreboard, manufactured by ANC Sports, is similar to other scoreboards in new NBA & NHL arenas. An additional linear LED display lining the entire arena was also installed between the suite and mezzanine levels. Other renovations for the Wachovia Center's ten-year anniversary included upgrading the suites with more flat screen HDTV's, as well as changing ticket providers from Ticketmaster to New Era Tickets, which is owned by Comcast Spectacor.

The public address (PA) announcer at the Wells Fargo Center for Flyers games is Lou Nolan, who moved with the team from the Spectrum, where he worked since 1972. Matt Cord is the PA announcer for 76ers games. Jim Bachman is the PA announcer for Villanova basketball games. Vinnie Caligiuri was the PA announcer for the Philadelphia Soul during their tenure. Kevin Casey handled PA duties for the original Philadelphia Wings during their tenure. Marc Farzetta is the PA announcer for the current Philadelphia Wings.

Wells Fargo Center continued further renovations as part of a $265 million "Transformation 2020" initiative. The arena also unveiled a new premium area for selected ticketholders known as the "Center City Club", and—as part of a partnership with Rivers Casino Philadelphia—two sportsbook lounges open to all visitors, which will feature a bar and seating areas, televisions and odds boards, and Rivers Casino ambassadors promoting use of the casino's sports betting app.

The arena also announced the New City Terrace, a revamp of the standing room deck into a  "Assembly Room" (inspired by Independence Hall), with bars and eateries, fireplaces, and communal areas. The area is designed to provide a "first-class experience at an accessible price point"; the arena's cheapest tickets will feature access to the level.

Concerts

 On August 13, 1996, a private concert by Ray Charles was the first event at the CoreStates Center, with a crowd of nearly 12,000. Each spectator was given a commemorative key acknowledging they helped "open the arena". The inaugural concert, on September 2, 1996, featured Oasis, with The Manic Street Preachers and The Screaming Trees, before an estimated crowd of 12,000. The Wells Fargo Center has since held other concerts by many famous artists.
 On December 6, 2002, hard rock band Guns N' Roses was scheduled to perform there on its Chinese Democracy Tour. The opening bands CKY and Mix Master Mike performed, but the main act, Guns N' Roses, never appeared, fueling a riot in the arena and causing about $30,000 to $40,000 in damage. No reason was ever given for the non-appearance by Guns N' Roses, other than the public announcement that one of the band members was ill.
 In 2006, Billy Joel set a record when he sold-out his 18th Wachovia Center concert.

In addition, hanging from the rafters of the Wells Fargo Center are  three banners in the orange and black colors of the Flyers honoring Pearl Jam's 10, Billy Joel's 48 Philadelphia sellouts and Bruce Springsteen's 56 Philadelphia sellouts respectively.

Tenants

Full time
Philadelphia Flyers of the National Hockey League
Philadelphia 76ers of the National Basketball Association
Philadelphia Wings of the National Lacrosse League

Part time
Villanova University Wildcats of the NCAA; High-attendance home games for which the on-campus arena, Finneran Pavilion, is inadequate to accommodate are played at the Wells Fargo Center. The men's team played the majority of its home games of the 2017–18 season here while Finneran Pavilion underwent renovations.

Former full time
Philadelphia Soul of the Arena Football League
Philadelphia Wings (second incarnation) of the National Lacrosse League

Former part time
Philadelphia Phantoms of the American Hockey League (AHL); the Flyers' AHL development club played some regular season and Calder Cup playoff games at the Wells Fargo Center each season between 1996 and 2009 when the Spectrum was unavailable because of other events.

Capacity

Notable events

Sports
1996 World Cup of Hockey (three games)
WWF In Your House: Mind Games, 1996
1997 Stanley Cup Finals
1998 United States Figure Skating Championships
1998 NLL Championship
1999 AHL All-Star Classic
WrestleMania XV, 1999
2000 NCAA Women's Basketball Final Four
WWF Unforgiven, 2000
2001 NCAA men's basketball tournament East Regional
2001 NBA Finals
The Los Angeles Lakers won the NBA Championship at the Wells Fargo Center, winning Game 5 and the series, 4–1.
X Games VII, 2001
2002 NBA All-Star Game
X Games VIII, 2002
WWE Royal Rumble, 2004
2005 AHL Calder Cup Finals
The Philadelphia Phantoms won the Calder Cup at the Wells Fargo Center, defeating the Chicago Wolves in Game 4 and winning the series, 4–0.
2006 NCAA Division I men's basketball tournament, 1st & 2nd rounds
WWE Survivor Series, 2006
U.S. Olympic Team Trials – Gymnastics, 2008
2009 NCAA Division I men's basketball tournament, 1st & 2nd rounds
WWE Night of Champions, 2009
UFC 101, 2009
2010 Stanley Cup Finals
The Chicago Blackhawks won the Stanley Cup at the Wells Fargo Center, winning Game 6 and the series, 4–2.
NCAA Men's Wrestling Championship, 2011
UFC 133, 2011
2013 NCAA Division I men's basketball tournament, 2nd & 3rd rounds
WWE Money in the Bank, 2013
NCAA Men's Ice Hockey Championship, 2014
2014 NHL Entry Draft
WWE Royal Rumble, 2015
2016 NCAA Division I men's basketball tournament East Regional
 2016 Kellogg's Tour of Gymnastics Champions
WWE Battleground, 2017
ArenaBowl XXX, 2017
WWE NXT TakeOver: Philadelphia, 2018, WWE Royal Rumble 2018, WWE Raw, January 29, 2018, WWE SmackDown, January 30, 2018 as part of the Royal Rumble weekend
 WWE Extreme Rules, 2019
Show featured The Undertaker's final match in front of a live audience in the United States before his retirement in 2020.
 WWE Elimination Chamber, 2020
This was the last WWE pay-per-view (PPV) event held before COVID-19 was declared a pandemic, causing WWE to relocate their shows to the WWE Performance Center with no fans in attendance.
 2022 NCAA Division I men's basketball tournament East Regional
The arena hosted Saint Peter's 67–64 upset win over Purdue in the Sweet 16, becoming the first ever 15 seed to advance to the Elite Eight.
 WWE Extreme Rules, 2022
Show featured the reveal of the White Rabbit as a returning Bray Wyatt at the end of the event.
 WWE Raw is XXX (aka Raw's 30th Anniversary), January 23, 2023
Show featured appearances by multiple WWE Hall Of Famers including: The Undertaker, Hulk Hogan, as well as Triple H and Shawn Michaels (who reunited D-Generation X) and the return of Brock Lesnar
 WWE SmackDown, April 5, 2024 and WWE Raw, April 8, 2024 as part of WrestleMania 40 weekend

Esports
 Overwatch League Grand Finals, 2019

Television
Buletin Utama from Philadelphia, 2004
Wheel of Fortune from Philadelphia, 2004
Wheel of Fortune Family Week, 2004
Wheel of Fortune Teen Best Friends Week, 2005
American Idol auditions, 2007
Harvest America, 2013

Politics
2000 Republican National Convention
2016 Democratic National Convention

Controversy
In October 2019, center staff removed fans shouting "Free Hong Kong" at a pre-season basketball game between the Philadelphia 76ers and Guangzhou Loong Lions.

See also
List of indoor arenas in the United States
List of NCAA Division I basketball arenas

References

Notes

External links

 

1996 establishments in Pennsylvania
Basketball venues in Philadelphia
Esports venues in Pennsylvania
Gymnastics venues in the United States
Indoor arenas in Pennsylvania
Indoor ice hockey venues in Pennsylvania
Indoor lacrosse venues in the United States
Mixed martial arts venues in the United States
Music venues completed in 1996
National Basketball Association venues
National Hockey League venues
Philadelphia 76ers venues
Philadelphia Wings
Rugby league stadiums in the United States
Rugby league in Pennsylvania
South Philadelphia
Sports venues completed in 1996
Sports venues in Philadelphia
Villanova Wildcats basketball
Wrestling venues in Pennsylvania
Philadelphia Flyers